Jeffrey Hart Brotman (September 27, 1942 – August 1, 2017) was an American attorney, entrepreneur, and executive. Brotman was the co-founder and chairman of Costco Wholesale Corporation.

Early life and education
Brotman was born in a Jewish family in Tacoma, Washington, the son of Pearl and Bernie Brotman. His grandparents were Jewish emigrants from Romania to Saskatchewan; his parents immigrated to the US and settled in Tacoma. His father was an owner of Seattle Knitting Mills.  Along with his uncles, he owned a chain of 18 retail stores in Washington and Oregon named Bernie's.

In 1965, the family moved to Seattle. Brotman graduated from the University of Washington in 1964 with a degree in political science and in 1967 with a J.D. He was a member of the Zeta Beta Tau fraternity at the University of Washington. After school, he and his brother, Michael, founded a women's jeans store named Bottoms; and in the 1980s, they founded the Jeffrey Michael chain of men's clothing stores, which they operated into the 1990s.

Career
In 1982, Brotman co-founded Costco Wholesale Corporation with Jim Sinegal, a protégé of Sol Price, the founder of PriceSmart. He served as chairman from the company's inception until his death, except during a stretch from 1993 to 1994 when he was vice chairman. In 2017, Costco operated 736 warehouse stores.

Brotman was also an early investor in Howard Schultz's Starbucks coffee.

Philanthropy
Brotman served on the boards of several public companies and according to Businessweek magazine, was "connected to 13 board members". He sat on the board of directors of the Million-Dollar Roundtable at the United Way of King County. He also served on the boards of Seafirst Bank, Starbucks, and was a trustee at the Seattle Art Museum.  He and his wife Susan donated to numerous causes, especially at the University of Washington, where they funded hundreds of student scholarships.  They also endowed the Jeffrey & Susan Brotman Professorship at UW Law School, currently held by Steve Calandrillo.

Personal life 
Brotman was married to Susan Thrailkill, a Montana native and former Nordstrom executive; they had two children, Justin Brotman, an activist and entrepreneur, and Amanda Brotman-Schetritt, a Barnard College graduate who is an entrepreneur working in sustainability, philanthropy, and design.

On August 1, 2017, Brotman died in Medina, Washington at the age of 74.  He died in his sleep, possibly due to heart failure. He was a member of Temple Beth El in Tacoma.

References

American company founders
Costco people
1942 births
2017 deaths
Businesspeople from Tacoma, Washington
Washington (state) lawyers
University of Washington College of Arts and Sciences alumni
American people of Romanian-Jewish descent
20th-century American businesspeople
21st-century American businesspeople
People from Medina, Washington
University of Washington School of Law alumni
20th-century American lawyers